As of 2015, Tirukkural has been translated into Saurashtra only once.

Background
An Indo-Aryan language belonging to the Indo-Iranian branch of the Indo-European language family, Saurashtra, once spoken in the Saurashtra region of Gujarat, is spoken today chiefly by a small population of Saurashtrians settled in parts of Tamil Nadu. With the Saurashtrian language being the only Indo-Aryan language employing a Dravidian script, the population’s familiarity with the language resulted in the translation of the Tirukkural in this language spoken by a small number of people.

Tirukkural Payiram—Pitika Pragaranam by S. Sankhu Ram remains the only known translation of the Kural text into the Saurashtra language. It was posthumously published in 1980 in Madurai. The work was published again in 1993.

Translations

See also
 Tirukkural translations
 List of Tirukkural translations by language

References

Published Translations
 Sankhu Ram (Trans.). (1993). Sourashtra Tirukkural (in Tamil Scripts). Madurai: Siddhasramam.

External links
 

Saurashtra
Translations into Saurashtra